Ofir Davidzada (or Davidadze, ; born ) is an Israeli professional footballer who plays as a left back for Maccabi Tel Aviv.

Early life
Davidzada was born in Beersheba, Israel, to a Sephardic Jewish family.

Club career

Hapoel Be'er Sheva
He made his debut for Hapoel Be'er Sheva against Maccabi Haifa in February 2010. He established himself in the team during the 2010–11 season.

Gent
On 5 August 2016, it was announced that Davidzada has signed a four-season contract with K.A.A. Gent and would join the team after Hapoel Be'er Sheva's Champions League qualifying play-off matches against Scottish Champions Celtic.

Maccabi Tel Aviv
On 7 September 2018, Davidzada signed a four-year deal with Maccabi Tel Aviv.

International career
Davidzada was called up to represent Israel at under-21 level. He took part in the 2013 UEFA European Under-21 Football Championship.

Honours
Hapoel Be'er Sheva
 Israeli Premier League: 2015–16

Maccabi Tel Aviv
 Israeli Premier League: 2018–19, 2019–20
 Toto Cup: 2017–18, 2018–19, 2020–21
 Israel Super Cup: 2019, 2020

See also 
 List of Jewish footballers
 List of Jews in sports
 List of Israelis

References

Living people
1991 births
Israeli Sephardi Jews
Israeli footballers
Jewish footballers
Association football fullbacks
Israel under-21 international footballers
Hapoel Be'er Sheva F.C. players
K.A.A. Gent players
Maccabi Tel Aviv F.C. players
Israeli Premier League players
Belgian Pro League players
Israeli expatriate footballers
Expatriate footballers in Belgium
Israeli expatriate sportspeople in Belgium
Footballers from Beersheba
Sportspeople of Iranian descent
Israeli people of Iranian-Jewish descent
Israeli Mizrahi Jews